Chohar Kot is town and union council of Barkhan District in the Balochistan province of Pakistan. It is on the territorial border with the Punjab province. It has a population of about 2000.

References

Populated places in Barkhan District
Union councils of Balochistan, Pakistan